Waldenburg is a town in Poinsett County, Arkansas, United States. The population was 80 at the 2000 census. It is included in the Jonesboro, Arkansas Metropolitan Statistical Area. Waldenburg is home to Zion Lutheran Church. Zion was founded in 1881 and is a member congregation of the Lutheran Church–Missouri Synod.

Geography

Waldenburg is located at  (35.565984, -90.933779).

Demographics

As of the census of 2000, there were 80 people, 33 households, and 20 families residing in the town. The population density was 588.2 inhabitants per square mile (220.6/km). The racial makeup of the town was 93.75% White, 5.00% Black or African American, and 1.25% from two or more races.

There were 33 households, out of which 27.3% had children under the age of 18 living with them, 54.5% were married couples living together, 6.1% had a female householder with no husband present, and 36.4% were non-families. 33.3% of all households were made up of individuals, and 3.0% had someone living alone who was 65 years of age or older. The average household size was 2.42 and the average family size was 3.19.

In the town, the population was spread out, with 23.8% under the age of 18, 10.0% from 18 to 24, 22.5% from 25 to 44, 32.5% from 45 to 64, and 11.3% who were 65 years of age or older. The median age was 39 years. For every 100 females, there were 110.5 males. For every 100 females age 18 and over, there were 134.6 males.

The median income for a household in the town was $23,750, and the median income for a family was $33,250. Males had a median income of $16,250 versus $16,250 for females. The per capita income for the town was $11,452. There were no families and 12.0% of the population living below the poverty line, including no under eighteens and 20.0% of those over 64.

Education
It is within the Harrisburg School District. It was formerly in the Weiner School District, which consolidated into the Harrisburg district on July 1, 2010.

Gallery

References

Towns in Poinsett County, Arkansas
Towns in Arkansas
Jonesboro metropolitan area